Les Moreres is a Barcelona Metro station, located in the El Prat de Llobregat municipality, in the Metropolitan area of Barcelona. The station is served by line L9.

The station is located underneath the square between Av. de la Verge de Montserrat and Carrer de les Moreres. There are two entrances at Av. de la Verge de Montserrat, which serve an underground ticket hall.

The station was opened in 2016, when line L9 was extended from Zona Universitaria station to Aeroport T1 station.

References

External links
Trenscat.com

Barcelona Metro line 9 stations
Railway stations in Spain opened in 2016